The 2016 NCAA Division I baseball season, play of college baseball in the United States organized by the National Collegiate Athletic Association (NCAA) at the Division I level, began in February 2016.  The season progressed through the regular season, many conference tournaments and championship series, and concluded with the 2016 NCAA Division I baseball tournament and 2016 College World Series.  The College World Series, consisting of the eight remaining teams in the NCAA tournament and held annually in Omaha, Nebraska, at TD Ameritrade Park Omaha, ended on June 30, 2016, with Coastal Carolina claiming its first NCAA title in a team sport.

Realignment
Northern Kentucky left the Atlantic Sun Conference for the Horizon League.
NJIT joined the Atlantic Sun, leaving the ranks of Independents.
The merger of the University of Texas–Pan American and the University of Texas at Brownsville, formally announced in 2013, took full effect with the 2015–16 school year, creating the new Texas–Rio Grande Valley. The new institution retained Texas–Pan American's membership in the Western Athletic Conference.
Akron, of the Mid-American Conference, discontinued its program.

Season outlook

Conference standings

Conference winners and tournaments
Twenty-nine athletic conferences each end their regular seasons with a single-elimination tournament or a double-elimination tournament. The teams in each conference that win their regular season title are given the number one seed in each tournament. The winners of these tournaments receive automatic invitations to the 2016 NCAA Division I baseball tournament.

College World Series

The 2016 College World Series began on June 18 in Omaha, Nebraska.

Coaching changes
This table lists programs that changed head coaches at any point from the first day of the 2016 season until the day before the first day of the 2017 season.

See also

2016 NCAA Division I baseball rankings
2016 NCAA Division I baseball tournament

References